Max Salazar (April 17, 1932 – September 19, 2010) was an American musicologist specializing in the history of Latin music. He was a senior editor of the Latin Beat Magazine and the contributing editor of the Impacto magazine. He was a lecturer at the UCLA, Smithsonian Institution and several colleges.

His 2002 book Mambo Kingdom: Latin Music in New York contains a number of articles about mambo star Tito Puente and over 200 other dance articles for magazines such as Village Voice, Latin Times, and Billboard.

Books

References

External links 
Obituary in All About Jazz
 Salazar, Max, "Joe Quijano: la Pachanga se baila así", Latin Beat Magazine, August, 1998
 Salazar, Max, "Gabriel Oller: Aguinaldos de Salsa - TT: Gabriel Oller: Salsa Music bonus", Latin Beat Magazine, March, 2000

American male journalists
Puerto Rican journalists
1932 births
2010 deaths
Dance writers
American music journalists